Dunchurch railway station was a railway station serving  Dunchurch in the English county of Warwickshire on the Rugby to Leamington line.

Among the many schemes to build a line between Rugby and Leamington was one by the Rugby, Leamington and Warwick Railway Company.  This later became known as the Rugby and Leamington Railway and received royal assent on 13 August 1846.  The undertaking was sold to the London and North Western Railway on 17 November 1846 and the line opened on 1 March 1851.

When the line opened there were only two intermediate stations (at Birdingbury and Marton) despite Dunchurch's population of 6,061 at the time. Dunchurch had to wait more than 20 years before the LNWR opened the station at the point where the railway crossed beneath the road to Coventry (now the A45 trunk road) 1¾ miles west of the village.

Dunchurch station received the same service as the other intermediate stations. Bradshaw's July 1922 timetable shows 10 trains a day to Rugby and 9 trains to Leamington Spa. The service was unchanged in the timetable of July 1938.

The station closed to passengers on 15 June 1959 and closed to freight on 2 November 1964.

References

External links
 Dunchurch at Warwickshire Railways website
 Dunchurch station on navigable 1946 O. S. map

Disused railway stations in Warwickshire
Railway stations in Great Britain opened in 1871
Railway stations in Great Britain closed in 1959
Former London and North Western Railway stations